The 2007 Italian Grand Prix (officially the Formula 1 Gran Premio d'Italia 2007) was a Formula One motor race held on 9 September 2007 at Autodromo Nazionale di Monza, Italy. It was the thirteenth race of the 2007 FIA Formula One World Championship.

Going into the race, McLaren's Lewis Hamilton held a 5-point lead over team-mate Fernando Alonso in the Drivers' Championship, whilst McLaren held an 11-point lead over Ferrari in the Constructors' Championship. Ferrari were expected to do well at home after a one-two finish in the Turkish GP and Michael Schumacher's victory at Monza the previous year.  However, McLaren dominated the traditional test session prior to the Grand Prix, with Alonso topping the time sheets on two of the four days and Hamilton and Pedro de la Rosa fastest on the other days.

Fernando Alonso took his  fourth win of the season, leading home the fourth one-two finish of  the season for McLaren as Lewis Hamilton finished second. It was McLaren's eighth victory at Monza  and Mercedes'  fourth, while Alonso  became the first Spaniard  to win the Italian Grand Prix. It turned out to be his last win for McLaren, and McLaren's last 1-2 finish until the 2010 Chinese Grand Prix.

Report

Qualifying
The two Spykers of Adrian Sutil and Sakon Yamamoto were both eliminated in Q1, along with Vitantonio Liuzzi in the Toro Rosso, Takuma Sato of Super Aguri, and, surprisingly, the Toyota of Ralf Schumacher and David Coulthard's Red Bull.

In the second session, both the Toro Rosso of Sebastian Vettel and Anthony Davidson's Super Aguri, who had done very well to make the session, were eliminated. So were Giancarlo Fisichella in the Renault, Alexander Wurz of Williams, the Honda of Rubens Barrichello and Coulthard's Red Bull teammate Mark Webber.

Jenson Button had done excellently to put the Honda in the top 10, and he qualified tenth, on the fifth row with Jarno Trulli's Toyota. Nico Rosberg qualified his Williams eighth, alongside the second Renault of Heikki Kovalainen, who had put in a brilliant performance. Robert Kubica took 6th in the BMW Sauber, while his teammate Nick Heidfeld broke the domination of the top 4 by McLaren and Ferrari, beating the Scuderia's Kimi Räikkönen to 4th. However, it was service as normal at the very front, with Räikkönen's teammate Felipe Massa taking 3rd, and the two McLarens of Lewis Hamilton and Fernando Alonso locking out the front row, with the Spaniard just pipping his younger teammate to pole by 0.037 of a second.

Race
The top three held station from the start, but Kimi Räikkönen's Ferrari jumped Nick Heidfeld in the BMW Sauber and moved into fourth. Jarno Trulli was a big loser in the Toyota, slipping from 9th to 13th, while the big winner was David Coulthard, who went from 20th to 15th in the Red Bull.

On lap 2, however, Coulthard crashed at Curva Grande, completely negating the influence of his brilliant start and with his car in a dangerous position the crash forced the safety car to be deployed. This allowed the Super Aguri of Anthony Davidson up into 15th.

The race's only other retirement was Räikkönen's teammate Felipe Massa, who retired with a suspension failure on lap 11 after running in third place. This allowed the Finn to move into third and Nico Rosberg to move into the points in his Williams.

Lewis Hamilton, running second in the McLaren, suffered a puncture on lap 19, and dropped down to 6th behind Räikkönen, the two BMW Saubers of Heidfeld and Robert Kubica and Heikki Kovalainen's Renault. Räikkönen then took the lead as Hamilton's teammate Fernando Alonso pitted from the lead on lap 21.

A recovering Hamilton moved back to third place behind Räikkönen and Alonso after the two BMW Saubers and Kovalainen pitted, but as the Ferrari man emerged from his pitstop, Hamilton was still behind. He made a daring move down the inside of turn one to recover second place, more or less confirming a McLaren 1-2. Alonso retained the lead.

There were no further changes at the front, and Alonso led home by six seconds from Hamilton, with Räikkönen completing the podium. Heidfeld finished in fourth just four seconds ahead of his teammate Kubica, with Rosberg still in close contention in sixth. Kovalainen was seventh, and Jenson Button rounded out the points in a rare foray into the points paying positions for the Honda team.

Classification

Qualifying

Race

Championship standings after the race 

Drivers' Championship standings

Constructors' Championship standings

Note: Only the top five positions are included for both sets of standings. Constructors' Championship standings accurate as at final declaration of race results. McLaren was subsequently excluded from the championship.
 Bold text indicates competitors who still had a theoretical chance of becoming World Champion.

See also 
 2007 Monza GP2 Series round

References

External links

Detailed Italian Grand Prix results

Italian Grand Prix
Italian Grand Prix
Grand Prix
September 2007 sports events in Europe